Clearly Canadian is a brand of premium flavored and unflavored sparkling and springwater, that is produced by The Clearly Food & Beverage Company Ltd., of Canada. The brand was founded in 1987 in British Columbia, Canada.  Outside of Canada, it is well known throughout the United States, parts of Europe and Japan.

History
Founded in 1987 by Gordon Sim, Doug Mason and others in British Columbia, the brand is considered by many as the first premium "new age beverage" product that precipitated the multibillion-dollar market as it exists today, and has produced product every year since 1987 except for 2010 and 2011.

Clearly Canadian experienced broad corporate mismanagement during much of the last decade that led to it being acquired by a CPG focused turnaround team in 2012. Large-scale commercial production has resumed again in Canada after a number of limited short production runs during the 2012 to 2014 period.  The company's turnaround was precipitated by an online consumer promoted crowd-sourcing campaign that pre-sold in excess of 40,000 cases. Rhett and Link, hosts of an internet comedy show named "Good Mythical Morning", played a major role in promoting the campaign, attempting to help bring back the beverage of their childhood.
Clearly Canadian has been a top-performing premium sparkling water brand since its re-introduction to Distribution in 2017 and has top brand and top SKU performance, gaining distribution across North America.

Acquisitions
The firm has owned at one time or another My Organic Baby, DMR Food Corporation, and Cascade Clear Water Co.

Timeline 
1987: Clearly Canadian flavoured sparkling water is introduced.
1993: Annual sales hit $155 million.
1993: Royalty agreement with Camfrey Resources is terminated for $22.9 million.
1994: Clearly Tea and Clearly Two beverages are test-marketed.
1996: Hostile acquisition pursuit of Sun-Rype Products Ltd. initiated.
1996: Orbitz, with free-floating gel spheres, is introduced.
1997: Cascade Clear Water Co. is acquired.
1998: Clearly Canadian O+2, Battery, and Refresher drinks are introduced.
2000: Packaging of flagship line is redesigned and diet flavours are added. 
2001: Founding Management exits.
2005: Recapitalization brings about new ownership and management.
2006: Company founder resigns as chairman.
2007: DMR Food Corporation is acquired.
2007: My Organic Baby is acquired.
2010: Successful creditor reorganization.
2012: 4NCapital Partners, led by Robert Khan, acquires company. 
2013: Fan-sourced (crowd-sourcing) direct-to-consumer pre-sales campaign.
2015: Pre-sale campaign reached its goal of 25,000 cases pre-sold, pushing the product back into production.
2017: Clearly Canadian producing at national levels in both Vancouver and Montreal.

Brands, products & flavours

Clearly Canadian has released many product SKUs and formats over the years, including the following flavoured sparkling waters (with current offerings as of 2018 in italics):

Wild Cherry
 Green Apple
 Peach Mango
Orchard Peach
Mountain Blackberry
 Coastal Cranberry
 Summer Strawberry
Country Raspberry
 Western Loganberry
 Tropical Tangerine
 Alpine Fruit & Berries
 Blueberry

Additionally, the brand has released the following products:

 Clearly Tea
 Clearly Sparkling Tea
 Clearly Canadian Sparkling Water (non-flavoured)
 Reebok Fitness Water by Clearly Canadian
 DailyHydration
 DailyEnergy
 DailyVitamin
 DailyBeauty *(never released)
 Clearly O+2
 Tre Limone
 Orbitz

Bottle history
Clearly Canadian has been released in a number of packaging formats, principally in glass and PET bottles, that have always highlighted their distinctive flavours with vibrant colours and graphics. The brand's first generation signature "tear drop" glass bottle, shown to the right and for which the brand is famous, is an 11-oz (325-ml) light blue conical bottle. This bottle has come in two styles, one embossed with the name Clearly Canadian on it, the other not.  The brand's second generation glass bottle was a 14-oz (414-ml) cylindrical bottle, which has been discontinued. In PET plastic, the brand has been available from time-to-time in standard 16 oz. (448ml) formats.

Beverage ingredients
The beverages have used a number of different ingredients and formulas over the years. The flagship sparkling flavoured water “originals” uses carbonated Canadian spring water, natural vegan flavour with pure cane sugar. It is 90 Calories per bottle and non-GMO.

In popular culture
Throughout the 1990s, Clearly Canadian was featured in numerous mainstream television shows and films, including Sex and the City, Seinfeld, Friends, Dawson's Creek, Weekend at Bernie's, Jerry Maguire, One Foot In the Grave and The Vanishing.

See also 
 Orbitz (soft drink)

References

Soft drinks
Canadian brands
Carbonated water
Canadian drinks
Canadian cuisine